This is a list of documentary films for individual Winter Olympic Games which feature actual competition footage.  An Olympic Film Collection of the IOC Olympic Foundation for Culture and Heritage (OFCH) includes fifty feature-length films providing a history of the modern Olympic Games. A collection of many Official films was restored, and released as a 2017 home video box set under the title 100 Years of Olympic Films: 1912–2012. “Official” films are those which have been arranged by the host city organizing committee and produced in compliance with the International Olympic Committee charter.

See also 
Olympics on television
FIFA World Cup official films

References

External links 
Official Films at Olympics.com
Olympic Film Reviews at worldfilmreviews.us
Olympic Films and Documentaries at Boston College Library

Lists of documentary films
Lists of sports films
Documentary films about the Olympics

ja:オリンピックの公式記録映画一覧#冬季大会